The Funeral Party is a 2007 Russian drama film directed by Vladimir Fokin.

Plot 
The film takes place in New York in the 90s. The film tells about a talented artist who plays the performance of "life and death" in front of his friends and fans.

Cast 
 Aleksandr Abdulov as Alik
 Anna Aleksakhina as Nina
 Elena Rufanova as Irina Pearson
 Polina Fokina as Valentina
 Anna Dvorzhetskaya
 Vladimir Eryomin as Libin
 Vladimir Kachan as Fima Gruber
 Liya Akhedzhakova as Marya Ignatyevna
 Aleksey Kolgan as Father Viktor
 Yan Tsapnik as Rabbi Menashe
 Boris Klyuyev as Lyova Gottlieb

References

External links 
 

2007 films
2000s Russian-language films
Russian drama films
2007 drama films